Galasso Alghisi (1523–1573) was an Italian architect and author of the Renaissance period.

Biography
Born in Carpi, near Modena, he was architect to the duke of Ferrara. He published a book in Venice in 1570 on architecture, specially of buildings in Rome. He is also known as Galeazzo Alghisi. It includes simple engravings showing Fonte Sista in Rome; a view of the Belvedere, vatican gardens, and an incomplete St Peter's Basilica; the Villa d'Este in Tivoli; the arrangements of statuary in the niches of the Loggia del Lione of the Villa Medici in the Pincio district of Rome; dimensions of a palace resembling Palace of Raphael in Rome; the construction by Michelangelo in St Peter's including his putative design without Carlo Maderno's facade and showing the adjacent Vatican palace at the time (the obelisk in the position not reached till the 1580s); House by Bramante in Rome; San Giovanni Laterano with adjacent Lateran Palace; Facade, cross section, and courtyard of Palazzo Farnese with Farnese Hercules; Senate house on Capitoline Hill; a reconstruction of the Theater of Marcellus; Ponte sant angelo and Castel sant Angelo before decoration; the ruins of the Colloseum and sites of the Roman Forum.
 Galassi Alghisii Carpens., apud Alphonsum II. Ferrariae Ducem architecti, opus, By Galasso Alghisi, Dominicus Thebaldius (Frontispiece dated 1563). Some engravings dated 1582.

References

1523 births
1573 deaths
People from Carpi, Emilia-Romagna
Renaissance architects
Italian art historians
16th-century Italian architects
Architects from Naples
Architects from Rome